Merrigum was a railway station at Merrigum, on the Toolamba–Echuca line, in Victoria, Australia. All that remains of the station is the mound on which the platform stood, and a section of track placed in what was the rail yard.

Flashing lights were provided at the Kyabram Road level crossing in October 1973.

References

Disused railway stations in Victoria (Australia)